Mose Alaric Timoteo (born 7 September 1976) is a former American rugby union player. He represented USA at the 2003 Rugby World Cup. He made his debut for the Eagles against Tonga in 2000. He made his last international appearance against Italy on June 23rd, 2012.

He is the Back line Coach for the Hayward Griffins U-19 Rugby Club in California.

References

External links
 ESPN Scrum Profile

1976 births
Living people
American rugby union players
United States international rugby union players
United States international rugby sevens players
Denver Stampede players